This is a list of drama serials with performances that have been nominated in all of the Star Awards acting categories.

Mediacorp annually bestows Star Awards for acting performances in the following four categories: Best Actor, Best Actress, Best Supporting Actor, and Best Supporting Actress.

Drama serials

As of 2023, there have been 27 drama serials containing at least one nominated performance in each of the four Star Awards acting categories, with two drama serials winning all four awards.

In the following list, award winners are listed in bold; others listed are nominees who did not win.

Superlatives 

Two drama serials won all four awards:

 Holland V 荷兰村 (2003)
 The Dream Makers II 志在四方II (2016)

Five drama serials won three awards:

 The Price of Peace 和平的代价 (1997) – lost Best Supporting Actor
 Stepping Out 出路 (1999) – lost Best Supporting Actress
 The Dream Makers 志在四方 (2014) – lost Best Actor
 The Journey: Tumultuous Times 信约：动荡的年代 (2015) – lost Best Actress
 A Million Dollar Dream 给我一百万 (2019) – lost Best Supporting Actress

Six of the nominated drama serials failed to win any of the four awards:

 The New Adventures of Wisely 卫斯理传奇 (1998)
 The Return of the Condor Heroes 神雕侠侣 (1998)
 Together 当我们同在一起 (2010) – but won Best Drama Serial
 Pillow Talk 再见单人床 (2013) – but won Best Drama Serial
 Against the Tide 逆潮 (2015)
 118 (2016)

41 performers were nominated for their work in multiple different drama serials that received nominations in all acting categories:

External links 

Star Awards